"A Ningún Hombre" (officially "A NINGÚN HOMBRE - Cap.11: Poder"; Spanish for "to no man") is a song performed by Spanish singer and songwriter Rosalía. A fan favorite, the song is the final track off the singer's second studio album El Mal Querer, which was released on November 2, 2018 through Columbia Records. It was produced by El Guincho and co-produced by Rosalía herself. The track has been streamed over 20 million times since its release.

Background and composition 
In 2017, Rosalía graduated from flamenco studies at the Catalonia College of Music in Barcelona. She presented her bachelor's degree project El Mal Querer, written by herself alongside Pablo Díaz-Reixa and ex-boyfriend Antón Álvarez, at that time and earned her a graduation with honors. The project was presented to Columbia Records the next year and was revamped and commercialized in November 2018 worldwide. The project is presented as a musical representation of the 13th century Occitan novel Flamenca, whose author remains unknown. This romance is about a young girl who marries a man who locks her up in a tower after discovering she has a lover and, in major part, because of jealousy and also due to the woman's undeniable beauty, which he is afraid of sharing. After her lover finds her and kills her husband in "Maldición", Rosalía makes a statement about celebrating her independence, abuse of power and swearing that she will never forget how badly she has been treated. Being a little over a minute and a half, the song is the second shortest track in the album or the shortest track in it the interlude isn't counted.

Critical and commercial reception 
The final track of El Mal Querer was very well received by critics. The Guardian stated that "A Ningún Hombre" is "a pretty visceral experience where her voice is powerful and gutsily emotive". The track peaked at the 35th position of the PROMUSICAE chart without being a single or a promotional track and lasted on it for three consecutive weeks. 5 other album tracks entered the chart. The song was the inspiration for many protestors who attended the International Women's Day March in 2019 and 2020 in many parts of Spain and Latin America.

Live performances 
"A Ningún Hombre" was performed during some shows in Spain and London in the summer of 2018 as well as during her El Mal Querer worldwide tour, which ran from March to December 2019. She also performed the track during the 2019 MTV Video Music Awards in Newark alongside "Yo x Ti, Tu x Mi" and "Aute Cuture".

Credits 
Rosalia Vila - producer, composer and lyricist
Pablo Díaz-Reixa - producer, composer and lyricist
Antón Álvarez - lyricist
 Jacob Richards - assistant engineer
Mike Seaberg - assistant engineer
Rashawn Mclean - assistant engineer
Chris Athens - mastering engineer
Jaycen Joshua - mixing engineer

Charts

References 

2018 songs
Rosalía songs
Song recordings produced by el Guincho
Songs written by Rosalía
Songs written by el Guincho